Iran–Malaysia relations refers to the current and historical relationship between Iran and Malaysia. Iran has an embassy in Kuala Lumpur, and Malaysia has an embassy in Tehran. Both countries are members of the Organisation of Islamic Cooperation (OIC) and the Non-Aligned Movement (NAM) and have used these forums and bilateral relations to develop political ties.

History 
Relations between the two countries have existed since the independence of Malaya. While Persian influences in Malay Peninsula are much longer with the traces were discovered some centuries ago as they were once engaged in trade in Lembah Bujang and Malacca together with the traces of Persian literature in Malay language.

Economic relations 
Both countries have co-operated in a number of large industrial projects, many of them in the energy sector. Earlier in October 2007, Iran and Malaysia are working towards an extensive multilateral oil refinery deal with Venezuela in Syria. In December 2007, the two signed a US$6 billion deal to develop areas of Iran's offshore gas fields.

In January 2017, the two countries are set to pursue a free trade agreement. A memorandum of understanding (MoU) on gas field study was signed in February between National Iranian Oil Company (NIOC) and Malaysia's Bukhary International Ventures (BIV). Both countries have integrated their banking transactions and also agreed to use local currencies along with Chinese yuan and Japanese yen in their bilateral trade. As of 2015, there are around 5,000 Iranian students in Malaysia, while only 15 Malaysian students in Iran.

Political relations 
Despite these matters of historical traces, political relations between two countries are recently tense due to alleged Iranian interferences promoting Shi'a Islam in largely Salafi-Sunni adherence of Malaysia which in response the latter government has passed several anti-Shi'a laws to limit the activities of Shi'a followers in the country to prevent their spread.

See also 
 Iranians in Malaysia

References 

 
Malaysia
Bilateral relations of Malaysia